Engin Benli (born 23 February 1970) is a Turkish actor.

Biography
After completing his first education in Izmir, he completed his undergraduate education at the State Conservatory of Anadolu University in Eskişehir in 1995. He started his professional theatrical life as an actor in Ankara State Theatre. He then worked as a trainee artist at Bursa State Theatre between 1995 and 1997. Since 1997, the year of its establishment, he has been participating as an actor in the Izmit City Theater. In addition to being a theater actor, he also does various film and television work. In particular, he was widely known for his role as commander-in-chief Orhan in the series Kanıt, which aired between 2010 and 2013. He later played the character of Zafer in the series Poyraz Karayel. He played the character Artem in the TV series Göç Zamanı. In 2019, the 134th episode of the Diriliş Ertuğrul was released, he was involved in the series with his character Alıncak. In 2020, he joined the TV series  as Yaman Korkmaz.

Filmography

Films

Television

References

External links 

 
 

Living people
1970 births
Turkish male film actors
Turkish male television actors
Turkish male stage actors